Julie Forrest (born 3 November 1968) is a Scottish bowls player.

Bowls career

Outdoors
Julie has won three World Outdoor medals, a silver medal in the fours at the 2000 World Outdoor Bowls Championship in Johannesburg and two bronze medals as part of the Scottish team that competed in the Taylor Trophy. She also competed at the 1996, 2000 and 2016.

She was selected to represent Scotland at the Commonwealth Games in 1998 and also won the Scottish National Bowls Championships pairs title in 1988 and triples title in 1997 bowling for Hawick.

Indoors
Most of her success has come indoors with her most significant wins being the two women's singles titles at the 2019 World Indoor Bowls Championship (defeating Alison Merrien in the final) and the 2020 World Indoor Bowls Championship. She had previously finished runner-up at the 2016 World Indoor Bowls Championship in the mixed pairs. and went on to win her third World indoor title by winning the mixed pairs with Stewart Anderson at the 2021 World Indoor Bowls Championship.

Julie also competed in the 2015 World Cup Singles where she won a silver medal losing out to Siti Zalina Ahmad in the final, the event is the southern hemisphere equivalent of the World Indoor title.

She has won seven IIBC indoor titles, including a record four ladies singles titles (2004, 2010, 2013, 2014) and three mixed pairs titles (2002, 2003, 2013). Forrest also won the last three editions of the WBT Scottish Women's Masters. She is also a record six-time Scottish indoor champion and a three-time British Isles indoor champion in singles competition.

In 2022, Forrest won the women's singles at the inaugural World Bowls Indoor Championships, defeating Gloria Ha in the final.

Awards
Forrest is a member of the Teviotdale Indoor Bowls Club in the Scottish Borders. She is also an Honorary Life Member of the Scottish Indoor Bowling Association (SIBA). Forrest has been playing with Tiger Bowls since 2003. She was inducted into the Scottish Borders Hall of Fame in 2007.

References

Scottish female bowls players
Scottish sportswomen
Bowls players at the 1998 Commonwealth Games
1968 births
Living people
Indoor Bowls World Champions
Commonwealth Games competitors for Scotland
Bowls European Champions